Not Yet (stylized as Not yet, pronounced as ) was a sub-unit of the all-female Japanese pop group AKB48.

History
The formation of Not Yet was announced at AKB48's Request Hour Set List Best 100 2011 on January 21, 2011. Their producer Yasushi Akimoto, who is also the producer of AKB48, revealed he named the group "Not Yet" because the members' dancing and singing skills were, as he described, not very good yet. They released their debut single  on March 16, 2011. The song, written by Akimoto, is about lovers who cannot wait for the weekend. Their album already, released on April 23, 2014, reached number one on the Weekly Oricon Albums Chart, selling 68,111 copies.

Members 

 Yui Yokoyama (AKB48's Team A, NMB48)
 Rino Sashihara (AKB48's Team B, HKT48)
 Yuko Oshima (AKB48's Team K)
 Rie Kitahara (AKB48's Team A, Team B, Team K, SKE48, NGT48)

Discography

Singles

References

External links 
 Not yet Official Site

AKB48 sub-units
Japanese girl groups
Japanese idol groups
Japanese pop music groups
Musical groups established in 2011
Nippon Columbia artists
Musical groups from Tokyo
2011 establishments in Japan